"A Sunday Kind of Love" is a popular song composed by Barbara Belle, Anita Leonard, Stan Rhodes, and Louis Prima and was published in 1946.

History 
The song has become a pop and jazz standard, recorded by many artists.
The song was first recorded by Claude Thornhill and his Orchestra on November 11, 1946. He released the song as a single in January, 1947 and it became permanently identified as the signature song for its vocalist, Fran Warren. Louis Prima and his Orchestra released his recording of the song in February 1947. The popularity of the up-tempo version by The Del-Vikings released in 1957 increased the song's popularity. Despite having wide acclaim, the song never made the Billboard Top 40.

Legacy
The song was featured in the jukebox musical Jersey Boys as well as the film version.

Notable recordings

 Claude Thornhill and his Orchestra with vocal by Fran Warren. Recorded on November 11, 1946, in New York, and released on Columbia Records 37219.
 Louis Prima and his Orchestra, February, 1947.
 Frankie Laine with an orchestra conducted by Carl T. Fischer. Recorded on January 21, 1947, and released on Mercury Records 5018.
 Jo Stafford with an orchestra conducted by Paul Weston. Recorded on February 28, 1947, and released on Capitol Records 388.
 Ella Fitzgerald  and the Andy Love Quintet with an orchestra conducted by Bob Haggart.  Recorded on March 19, 1947, and released on Decca Records 23866 and was included on her album For Sentimental Reasons
 The Harptones in 1953 on the Bruce label.
 The Del Vikings on their 1957 Come Along with Me/A Sunday Kind of Love/ The White Cliffs of Dover/Now is the Hour - Mercury EP 1-3359
 Hank Jones on the 1958 quartet album The Talented Touch
 Dinah Washington on her 1959 album, What a Diff'rence a Day Makes!
 Etta James on her 1960 album, At Last!
 Jan & Dean in 1962, which went to #95 on the Billboard Hot 100.
 Dion DiMucci on his 1969 album, Wonder Where I'm Bound
 The Four Seasons on their 1965 album, The 4 Seasons Entertain You
 Lenny Welch in 1972, which went to #96 on the Billboard Hot 100.
 Kenny Rankin on his 1975 album, Inside on Little David Records LD1009.
 Reba McEntire's version went to #5  on the Billboard Hot Country Singles chart and also went to #9 on the RPM Country Tracks chart in Canada, from her 1988 album, Reba.
 Renee Olstead on her 2004 album, Renee Olstead.
 Beth Rowley
 Jerry Lee Lewis
 Beth Hart and Joe Bonamassa on their 2013 album Seesaw.
 The Marcels in 1961 on Colpix Records.
Amy Vachal in The Voice Season 9 knockouts.

Notes and references

Notes

References 

1946 songs
Songs written by Louis Prima
Frankie Laine songs
Jo Stafford songs
Ella Fitzgerald songs
Etta James songs
Jan and Dean songs
Reba McEntire songs
Jerry Lee Lewis songs
1988 singles
MCA Records singles